Piacenza d'Adige is a comune (municipality) in the Province of Padua in the Italian region Veneto, located about  southwest of Venice and about  southwest of Padua.  

Piacenza d'Adige borders the following municipalities: Badia Polesine, Casale di Scodosia, Lendinara, Masi, Megliadino San Vitale, Merlara, Ponso, Sant'Urbano, Santa Margherita d'Adige, Vighizzolo d'Este.

References

Cities and towns in Veneto